Platform capitalism refers to the activities of companies such as Google, Facebook, Apple, Microsoft, Uber, Airbnb and others to operate as platforms. In this business model both hardware and software are used as a foundation (platform) for other actors to conduct their own business.

Platform capitalism is either heralded as beneficial  or denounced as detrimental  by various authors. The trends identified in platform capitalism have similarities with those described under the heading of surveillance capitalism.

The possible effect of platform capitalism on open science has been discussed.

Platform capitalism has been contrasted with platform cooperativism. Companies that try to focus on fairness and sharing, instead of just profit motive, are described as cooperatives, whereas more traditional and common companies that focus solely on profit, like Airbnb and Uber, are platform capitalists (or cooperativist platforms vs capitalist platforms). In turn, projects like Wikipedia, which rely on unpaid labor of volunteers, can be classified as commons-based peer-production initiatives.

See also 
Platform economy

References

Business models
Social sciences
Computing and society
Science and technology studies
Capitalism